Margherita is both a feminine given name and surname. 

Margherita may also refer to:

Places 
Margherita, Assam, India, a census town
Fort Margherita, an old fort built in 1879 by Charles Brooke, Rajah of Sarawak
The Italian name for Jamaame, a town in Somalia
Margherita Peak, the highest point of Mount Stanley, the third highest mountain in Africa

Other uses
Margherita (opera), an 1848 opera by Italian composer Jacopo Foroni
 "Margherita" (song), a song by Riccardo Cocciante
Palazzo Margherita, a palazzo in Rome
Pizza Margherita, a traditional Neapolitan pizza of tomatoes, cheese, and fresh basil
Democracy is Freedom – The Daisy, (Democrazia è Libertà – La Margherita), a former Italian political party
Margherita Hut, a mountain hut on Monte Rosa

See also
Margarita (disambiguation)